Anthony Emmanuel Silva (died 14 September 2002) was a Sri Lankan Tamil politician and Member of Parliament.

Silva contested the 1989 parliamentary election as one of the Eelam People's Revolutionary Liberation Front's candidates in Vanni District and was elected to Parliament. He later defected to the paramilitary Eelam People's Democratic Party. He contested the 2001 parliamentary election as an EPDP candidate in Vanni District but failed to get elected.

Silva was burnt to death at his house on 14 September 2002 under mysterious circumstances.

References

Eelam People's Democratic Party politicians
Eelam People's Revolutionary Liberation Front politicians
Members of the 9th Parliament of Sri Lanka
People from Northern Province, Sri Lanka
Sri Lankan Tamil politicians
20th-century births
Year of birth missing

2002 deaths